Money Feeds My Music Machine is the second studio album by Captain Howdy, released on April 21, 1998 by Shimmy Disc and Knitting Factory Records. It is a collaboration between musician and producer Kramer and magician Penn Jillette.

The album title is a phrase from the song Green Tambourine by The Lemon Pipers.

Track listing

Personnel 
Adapted from Money Feeds My Music Machine liner notes.

Captain Howdy
 Penn Jillette – vocals
 Kramer – instruments, vocals, production, engineering
Additional musicians
 Bill Bacon – percussion
 Tess (Kramer's 5 year old daughter) – vocals (4)
 Billy West – guitar

Production and additional personnel
Tony Fitzpatrick – cover art
Jed Rothenberg – assistant engineer
Steve Watson – assistant engineer

Release history

References

External links 
 Money Feeds My Music Machine at Discogs (list of releases)

 Money Feeds My Music Machine at YouTube (streamed copy where licensed)

1998 albums
Captain Howdy (band) albums
Albums produced by Kramer (musician)
Knitting Factory Records albums
Shimmy Disc albums